There have been two baronetcies created for persons with the surname Greene, one in the Baronetage of England and one in the Baronetage of the United Kingdom. Both creations are extinct.

The Greene Baronetcy, of Mitcham in the County of Surrey, was created in the Baronetage of England on 2 November 1664 for William Greene. The title became extinct on his death in 1671.

The Greene Baronetcy, of Nether Hall in the Parish of Thurston in the County of Suffolk, was created in the Baronetage of the United Kingdom on 21 June 1900 for Edward Greene, a brewer and Conservative Member of Parliament for Bury St Edmunds. His eldest surviving son, Sir Raymond, the second Baronet, represented Chesterton in Parliament. The title became extinct on the death of the latter's younger brother, Sir Edward, the third Baronet, in 1966. The first Baronet was the son of Edward Greene, Member of Parliament for Bury St Edmunds and Stowmarket, and the grandson of Benjamin Greene, who established the Greene King Brewery in Bury St Edmunds in 1799.

Greene baronets, of Mitcham (1664)
Sir William Greene, 1st Baronet (died 1671)

Greene baronets, of Nether Hall (1900)
Sir Edward Walter Greene, 1st Baronet (1842–1920)
Sir (Walter) Raymond Greene, DSO, 2nd Baronet (1869–1947)
Sir Edward Allan Greene, MC, 3rd Baronet (1882–1966)

References

Extinct baronetcies in the Baronetage of England
Extinct baronetcies in the Baronetage of the United Kingdom
1664 establishments in England